The 2016 Fort Lauderdale Strikers season is the team's sixth season in the North American Soccer League (NASL).

Players and staff

Current roster

Technical Staff
  Caio Zanardi - Head Coach and General Manager
  Phillip Dos Santos - Assistant Coach
  Ricardo Lopes – Goalkeepers Coach
  Cassiano Costa – Strength and Conditioning Coach
  Bruno Costa – Assistant General Manager and Head of Scouting

Competitions

Friendlies

Competitions

NASL Spring season

Standings

Results summary

Results by round

Matches

NASL Fall season

Standings

Results summary

Results by round

Matches

Combined Standings

U.S. Open Cup 

Fort Lauderdale Strikers will compete in the 2016 edition of the Open Cup.

Squad statistics

Appearances and goals

|-
|colspan="14"|Players who left Fort Lauderdale Strikers during the season:
|-

|}

Goal scorers

Disciplinary record

References

Fort Lauderdale Strikers
Fort Lauderdale Strikers seasons
Fort Lauderdale Strikers
Fort Lauderdale Strikers